T18 may refer to:

Aircraft 
 Slingsby T.18 Hengist, a British glider
 Thorp T-18, an American homebuilt aircraft

Armoured vehicles 
 T18 Boarhound, an American armoured car
 T18 Howitzer Motor Carriage，an American self-propelled gun
 T-18 tank, a Soviet tank

Rail and transit

Lines 
 Annapolis Road Line, of the Washington Metropolitan Area Transit Authority
 T18 line, of the Stockholm Metro
 T17/18 Beijing-Mudanjiang Through Train

Rolling stock 
 GER Class T18, a British steam locomotive
 Prussian T 18, a tank locomotive
 Tatra T18, a Czehoslovak draisine

Stations 
 Hara Station (Nagoya), Aichi, Japan
 Hibarigaoka Station (Hokkaido), Sapporo, Hokkaido, Japan
 Orange Town Station, Sanuki, Kagawa Prefecture, Japan
 Tenjimbashisuji Rokuchōme Station, Osaka, Japan
 Urayasu Station (Chiba), Japan

Other
 Edwards syndrome, or trisomy 18
 Estonian national road 18
 
 Toyota T-18, a Toyota Corolla model sold in Australia